Voiture (French, 'car') may refer to:

 Vincent Voiture (1597–1648) French poet
 333508 Voiture, an asteroid

See also

 Car (disambiguation)
 Passenger car (disambiguation)
 Voiturette (disambiguation)
 Eurofima coach, or Voiture Standard Européenne, a passenger rail car
 Voiture État, passenger rail car
 Voiture État à 2 étages, passenger rail car
 Voiture de banlieue à 2 niveaux, passenger rail car
 Bugatti La Voiture Noire, a prototype show car concept automobile